Facial femoral syndrome is a rare congenital disorder. It is also known as femoral dysgenesis, bilateral femoral dysgenesis, bilateral-Robin anomaly and femoral hypoplasia-unusual facies syndrome. The main features of this disorder are underdeveloped thigh bones (femurs) and unusual facial features.

Signs and symptoms
 Facial
 Lips - Cleft palate and/or thin lips. Prominent philtrum
 Jaw - Small and/or retracted jaw (micrognathia/retrognathia)
 Ears - Small or virtually absent ears (microtia/anotia)
 Eyes - Upwardly slanting eyelids
 Skeleton
 Short limbs (micromelia)
 Femurs - absent/abnormal
 Fused bones of the spine (sacrum and coccyx)
 Deformation of the foot that may be turned outward or inward ((talipes)-varus/valgus)
 Extra fingers or toes (polydactyly)
 Abnormal vertebral size or shape
 Short stature (dwarfism)
 Others
 Genitourinary abnormalities
 Underdeveloped lungs
 Patent ductus arteriosus

Of note intellectual development typically is normal.

Cause

The cause of this condition is not known. A genetic basis is suspected. More than one case have been reported in three families. It seems to be correlated to maternal diabetes mellitus in about a third of patients. There also have been links to maternal drug exposure, viral infections, radiation, and oligohydramnios.

Diagnosis

The diagnosis is based on the combination of unusual facial features and the dysplastic or absent femurs.

Diagnosis may be made antenatally.

Treatment

There is no known specific treatment for this condition. Management is supportive.

Epidemiology

This is a rare disorder with 92 cases reported up to 2017.

History
This condition was first described in 1975.

References

External links 

Congenital disorders
Rare syndromes